Péhé is a town in the far west of Ivory Coast, near the border with Liberia. It is a sub-prefecture of Toulépleu Department in Cavally Region, Montagnes District.

Péhé was a commune until March 2012, when it became one of 1126 communes nationwide that were abolished.

In 2014, the population of the sub-prefecture of Péhé was 10,835.

Villages
The 9 villages of the sub-prefecture of Péhé and their population in 2014 are:

Notes

Sub-prefectures of Cavally Region
Former communes of Ivory Coast